Ashley Pharoah (born 13 September 1959) is a British screenwriter and television producer. He is best known as the co-creator/writer of the successful drama series Life on Mars, which began on BBC One in 2006, and creator/writer of the family drama Wild at Heart, which aired on ITV1 from 2006 until 2012.

Early life
 was born in Southampton but grew up in Nailsea, North Somerset. He attended Waycroft Junior School in Stockwood and continued at Queen Elizabeth's Hospital, an independent school in Bristol.

 studied at the University of Sussex and the National Film and Television School in Beaconsfield in the 1980s. His graduation film Water's Edge was nominated for a BAFTA.

Career
 played rugby for Wimbledon and began his television writing career on the BBC soap opera EastEnders in 1991, on which he worked for four years and where he met co-writer Matthew Graham. He went on in 1994–1995 to contribute five episodes to the popular BBC One drama series Casualty and four episodes to Silent Witness (1996).

For ITV he created the long-running series Where the Heart Is, for which he wrote episodes from 1997 to 2000, and created the BBC One TV programme Down to Earth in 2001. Among other work in the early 2000s he scripted an adaptation of Tom Brown's Schooldays, starring Stephen Fry, for the ITV1 network in 2005.

Meanwhile, Matthew Graham and veteran Eastenders writer Tony Jordan spent years co-creating Life on Mars, which was first shown in 2006, and  contributed episodes to both series of the show.  Other work around this time included creating the series Wild at Heart (2006 – present) for Company Pictures and adapting Under the Greenwood Tree for Ecosse Films.

In 2006 he formed Monastic Productions with Matthew Graham. Monastic Productions is involved in the Life on Mars spin-off Ashes to Ashes and co-produced  Bonekickers, a six-part drama series about archaeology, set in Bath, Somerset. Both series are productions for BBC One. He has won two International Emmys for "Life on Mars", a series which was remade for ABC in America, starring Harvey Keitel.

In 2010  adapted Case Histories, the novel by Kate Atkinson, for the BBC. It stars Jason Isaacs and was a co-production between Monastic Productions and Ruby Television. Other work around this time include "Eternal Law" for ITV and an adaptation of Moonfleet for Sky, starring Ray Winstone. His series The Living And The Dead, starring Colin Morgan, was screened on BBC1 in the summer of 2016.

Pharoah was co-creator, writer and executive producer on an adaptation of Jules Verne's Around The World In Eighty Days, which starred David Tennant and was screened around the world in 2021.

Accolades
In February 2011  was made an Honorary Fellow of the National Film and Television School; this is awarded "in recognition of outstanding contribution to the British film and television industry".

In a ceremony at Bath Abbey in 2016,  was made a Doctor of Letters by Bath Spa University for his contribution to screenwriting and television production.

He was awarded the Hamilton Deane Award by the Dracula Society for The Living And The Dead in 2016

Writing credits

Awards and nominations

References

External links

 at bbc.co.uk.
 British stars dominate Emmy TV awards
http://www.telegraph.co.uk/culture/tvandradio/8115817/Screenwriters-clash-over-state-of-TV-drama.html
Interview with Ashley Pharoah by Montse Bru

1959 births
Living people
People educated at Queen Elizabeth's Hospital, Bristol
Alumni of the University of Sussex
Alumni of the National Film and Television School
Mass media people from Southampton
British soap opera writers
British television writers
English television writers
English screenwriters
English male screenwriters
English soap opera writers
British male television writers